Cyperus fertilis is a species of sedge that is native to parts of Africa.

See also 
 List of Cyperus species

References 

fertilis
Plants described in 1883
Flora of Angola
Flora of Cameroon
Flora of the Central African Republic
Flora of the Democratic Republic of the Congo
Flora of the Republic of the Congo
Flora of Equatorial Guinea
Flora of Gabon
Flora of Ghana
Flora of Ivory Coast
Flora of Liberia
Flora of Nigeria
Flora of Uganda
Taxa named by Johann Otto Boeckeler